Concord Duo Series Volume Ten is an album by jazz saxophonist Chris Potter and pianist Kenny Werner which was recorded at Maybeck Recital Hall and released by Concord in 1996.

Track listing
All compositions by Chris Potter except where noted
 "Hibiscus" − 8:35
 "Boulevard of Broken Time" (Kenny Werner) − 8:37
 "Istanbul (Not Constantinople)" (Jimmy Kennedy, Nat Simon) − 5:23
 "Sail Away" (Tom Harrell) − 6:03
 "Tala" (Chris Potter, Kenny Werner) − 4:32
 "September Song" (Kurt Weill, Maxwell Anderson) − 6:31
 "The New Left (And We Have Our Own Talk Show Host)" − 6:16
 "Epistrophy" (Thelonious Monk, Kenny Clarke) − 4:26
 "Hey Reggie" (Werner) − 7:16
 "Giant Steps" (John Coltrane) − 3:01

Personnel
Chris Potter - tenor saxophone, soprano saxophone, bass clarinet
Kenny Werner - piano

References

Chris Potter (jazz saxophonist) live albums
Kenny Werner live albums
1996 live albums
Concord Records live albums
Albums recorded at the Maybeck Recital Hall